Biomaterials is a peer-reviewed scientific journal covering research on and applications of biomaterials. It is published by Elsevier and the editor-in-chief is Kam W. Leong (Columbia University). The journal was established in 1980.

Abstracting and indexing
The journal is abstracted and indexed in:

According to the Journal Citation Reports, the journal has a 2020 impact factor of 12.479.

See also
Materials Today
Acta Biomaterialia
Materials Science and Engineering C

References

External links

Elsevier academic journals
Materials science journals
Publications established in 1985
English-language journals